Gholamreza (also Romanized as Gholāmreẕā; also known as Gholāmreẕāābād) is a village in Qaleh-ye Khvajeh Rural District, in the Central District of Andika County, Khuzestan Province, Iran. At the 2006 census, its population was 25, in 4 families.

References 

Populated places in Andika County